Slovenia–Turkey relations are the foreign relations between Slovenia and Turkey. Slovenia has an embassy in Ankara. Turkey has an embassy in Ljubljana.

Diplomatic relations 

After leaving the Soviet sphere in 1948, Yugoslavia sought, then withdrew from, a Balkan alliance with Greece and Turkey . Relations between Yugoslavia and Turkey became tense in the 1970s when Yugoslavia strongly backed Greece in the Cyprus dispute and supported the Palestine Liberation Organization against Israel, which was Turkey’s closest ally in the Middle East at the time.

Following Slovenia's Declaration of Independence in June 1991, relations between Slovenia  and Turkey improved considerably because both countries were strongly committed to the West and there were no historical disputes since Slovenia was never under Ottoman rule.

Presidential visits

Economic relations 
Trade volume between the two countries was US$1.15 billion in 2015.

See also 

 Foreign relations of Slovenia
 Foreign relations of Turkey
 Turkey–Yugoslavia relations

References

Further reading 

 "Prognosis for Political Stability in Yugoslavia in the Post- Tito Era," East European Quarterly, 22, No. 2, June 1988, pp. 173–90. 
 Banac, Ivo. The National Question in Yugoslavia: Origins, History, Politics. Ithaca: Cornell University Press, 1984. 
 Beloff, Nora. "Yugoslavia and the West," Est-Ouest [Trieste], 17, No. 4, 1986, pp. 149–67. 
 Biberaj, Elez. "Yugoslavia: A Continuing Crisis?" Conflict Studies [London], 225, October 1989, pp. 1–22. 
 Bukowski, Charles J. "Politics and Prospects for Economic Reform in Yugoslavia," East European Politics and Societies, 2, Winter 1988, pp. 94–151. 
 Bukowski, Charles J., and Mark A. Cichock (eds.). Prospects for Change in Socialist Systems. New York: Praeger, 1987. 
 Burg, Steven L. Conflict and Cohesion in Socialist Yugoslavia. Princeton: Princeton University Press, 1983. 
 Cvüc, Christopher. "Religion and Nationalism in Eastern Europe: The Case of Yugoslavia," Millennium, 14, No. 2, Summer 1985, pp. 195–206. 
 Denitch, Bogdan. "Yugoslavia: The Limits of Reform: Economic Crisis, Nationalism, Inner Strife," Dissent, 36, Winter 1989, pp. 78–85. 
 Djordjevic, Jovan (ed.). Drustveno-politicki sistem, SFRJ. Belgrade: 1995. * Doder, Dusko. The Yugoslavs. New York: Random House, 1978. 
 Gruenwald, Oskar, and Karen Rosenblum-Cale (eds.). Human Rights in Yugoslavia. New York: Irvington, 1986. 
 Jugoslovenski pregled. Constitutional System of Yugoslavia. Belgrade: Jugoslovenska stvarnost, Jugoslovenski pregled, 1980. 
 Klein, George, and Milan J. Reban (eds.). The Politics of Ethnicity in Eastern Europe. Boulder, Colorado: East European Monographs, 1981. 
 Linden, Ronald H. "The Impact of Interdependence: Yugoslavia and International Change," Comparative Politics, 18, No. 1, January 1986, pp. 211–34. 
 Lydall, Harold. Yugoslavia in Crisis. Oxford: Clarendon Press, 1989. 
 Magas, Branko. "Yugoslavia: The Spectre of Balkanization," New Left Review [London], No. 174, March–April 1989, pp. 3–31. 
 Milivojevic, Marko. "Yugoslavia's Security Dilemmas and the West," Journal of Strategic Studies, 8, No. 9, September 1985, pp. 284–306. 
 Pavlowitch, Stevan K. The Improbable Survivor: Yugoslavia and Its Problems, 1918–1988. Columbus: Ohio State University Press, 1988. 
 Pipa, Arshi. "The Political Situation of the Albanians in Yugoslavia with Particular Attention to the Kosovo Problem: A Critical Approach," East European Quarterly, 23, No. 2, June 1989, pp. 159–81. 
 Ramet, Pedro. "The Limits of Political Change in a Communist Country: The Yugoslav Debate, 1980-1986," Crossroads, 3, No. 23, November 1987, pp. 67–79. 
 Ramet, Pedro (ed.). Yugoslavia in the 1980s. Boulder, Colorado: Westview Press, 1985. 
 Remington, Robin Alison. "Nation Versus Class in Yugoslavia," Current History, 86, No. 11, November 1987, 365–68, 386–87. Rusinow, Dennison (ed.). 
 Yugoslavia: A Fractured Federalism. Washington: Wilson Center Press, 1988. 
 Sekelj, Laslo. "The Communist League of Yugoslavia: Elite of Power or Consciousness?" Socialism and Democracy, 6, Spring-Summer 1988, pp. 115–34. 
 Seroka, Jim. "Contemporary Issues and Stability in Socialist Yugoslavia," Journal of Communist Studies, 2, No. 6, June 1986, pp. 127–44. 
 Seroka, Jim, and Vukasin Pavlovic. "Yugoslav Trade Unions and the Paralysis of Political Decision-Making," Eastern European Politics and Societies, 1, Spring 1987, pp. 277–94. 
 Singleton, Fred. A Short History of the Yugoslav Peoples. Cambridge: Cambridge University Press, 1985. 
 Smiljkovic, Rados. Interesi i politicize akcije u samoupravljanju. Belgrade: Naucna knjiga, 1987. 
 Sruk, Josip. Ustavno uredjenje, SFRJ. Zagreb: Informator, 1976. Staar, Richard F. Communist Regimes in Eastern Europe. (5th ed.) Stanford, California: Hoover Institution Press, 1988. 
 Yugoslavia. The Constitution of the Socialist Federal Republic of Yugoslavia. Belgrade: Dopisna delavska univerza, 1974. 
 Zaninovich, M. George. "A Prognosis for Yugoslavia," Current History, 88, No. 11, November 1989, pp. 393–96, 404–405.

 
Turkey
Bilateral relations of Turkey